The goliath coucal (Centropus goliath) is a species of cuckoo in the family Cuculidae. It is found in the northern Maluku Islands.

References

goliath coucal
Birds of the Maluku Islands
goliath coucal
goliath coucal
Taxonomy articles created by Polbot